Melaenae or Melainai was a fortified deme of ancient Attica, on the frontier of Boeotia, celebrated in Attic mythology as the place for which Melanthus and Xanthus fought. It was sometimes called Celaenae or Kelainai (Κέλαιναι).

Its site is unlocated.

References

Populated places in ancient Attica
Former populated places in Greece
Demoi
Lost ancient cities and towns